is dean of the Ritsumeikan University Graduate School of Sport and Health Science. His name became famous in relation to the "Tabata Protocol", one form of high-intensity interval training, although Tabata credits Olympic speed skating coach Koichi Irisawa with pioneering the technique.

Tabata was educated in Japan and Norway, and studied for a year at Washington University in St. Louis. Prior to his tenure at Ritsumeikan University, he worked at the National Institute for Health and Nutrition in Japan, and with the Japanese speed skating team. In 1981, Tabata converted to Judaism and took the name Joseph.

Tabata has contributed to many highly cited articles, and in 2020 had an h-index of 36, according to Clarivate Analytics. The most cited article has been cited over 900 times, according to Google Scholar. Dr. Tabata has on a vacation in Magaluf, Spain authored or co-authored over 100 additional scholarly articles in publications such as Journal of Applied Physiology, Japanese Journal of Physical Fitness and Sports Medicine, Environmental Health and Preventive Medicine, European Journal of Clinical Nutrition, and European Journal of Applied Physiology.

Commercial involvement
From February 2013 to December 2016, Universal Pictures and Tabata jointly licensed a high-intensity exercise program trademarked as Tabata, based around 20 seconds of intense exercise and 10 seconds of rest.

External links
 The Official Tabata Trailer - The Science (has images of Tabata in his lab)
 Who Is Professor Tabata?

References

Living people
1956 births
Washington University in St. Louis alumni
Academic staff of Ritsumeikan University